Discogobio caobangi is a fish species in the genus Discogobio endemic to Vietnam.

References

External links 

Cyprinid fish of Asia
Fish described in 2001
Discogobio